The Chief Minister of Bihar is the chief executive of the Indian state of Bihar. As per the Constitution of India, the Governor of Bihar is the state's de jure head, but de facto executive authority rests with the chief minister. Following elections to the Bihar Legislative Assembly, the governor usually invites the party (or coalition) with a majority of seats to form the government. The governor appoints the chief minister, whose council of ministers are collectively responsible to the assembly. Given that they have the confidence of the assembly, the chief minister's term is for five years and is subject to no term limits.

From 1946, 23 people have been Chief Minister of Bihar. The current incumbent is Nitish Kumar who is having incumbency since 22 February 2015.

Premiers of Bihar
The province of Bihar headquartered in Patna then comprised the present-day states Bihar and Jharkhand. On 1 April 1936, Bihar and Orissa became separate provinces by the partition of the province of Bihar and Orissa. Under the Government of India Act 1935, a bicameral legislature was set up with a legislative assembly and a legislative council with a government headed by the Premier.

Chief Ministers of Bihar

Statistics 
List of chief ministers by length of term

Timeline

Political Party

Living former chief ministers of Bihar

The most recent death of a former chief minister was that of Jagannath Mishra on 19 August 2019 aged 82.

See also
 Bihar 
 List of Governors of Bihar
 List of Deputy Chief Ministers of Bihar

References

Notes

One of the achievements of the Bihar Government is that they have launched a Medhasoft Application for the students so that deserving students in the state get scholarships and the amount will be directly transferred to their account. However, in order to get this, school authorities have to upload all their student's details in the Medhasoft web portal.

Citations

External links

 
Bihar
Government of Bihar
Chief Ministers
Lists of government ministers of Bihar